Lewisburg is a city in, and the county seat of Marshall County, Tennessee, United States.  The population was 12,288 in 2020. Lewisburg is located in Middle Tennessee, fifty miles south of Nashville and fifty-two miles north of Huntsville, Alabama. Residents have access to the larger cities via nearby I-65.

Located among rolling hills, Lewisburg was named for the explorer Meriwether Lewis. By 1838, the town was supporting a newspaper and a bank.  The downtown area is similar to many other small southern towns, with a courthouse on a square, surrounded by retail and commercial businesses.  Shopping centers are located on the east and west ends of town.

Geography
Lewisburg is located at  (35.449034, -86.793112).

Climate

Demographics

2020 census

As of the 2020 United States census, there were 12,288 people, 4,394 households, and 2,758 families residing in the city.

2000 census
As of the census of 2000, there were 10,413 people, 4,242 households, and 2,740 families residing in the city. The population density was 891.5 people per square mile (344.2/km2). There were 4,584 housing units at an average density of 392.4 per square mile (151.5/km2). The racial makeup of the city was 79.96% White, 15.44% African American, 0.19% Native American, 0.47% Asian, 0.03% Pacific Islander, 2.85% from other races, and 1.06% from two or more races. Hispanic or Latino of any race were 5.15% of the population.

There were 4,242 households, out of which 29.2% had children under the age of 18 living with them, 43.4% were married couples living together, 16.6% had a female householder with no husband present, and 35.4% were non-families. 31.0% of all households were made up of individuals, and 13.7% had someone living alone who was 65 years of age or older. The average household size was 2.38 and the average family size was 2.94.

In the city, the population was spread out, with 24.2% under the age of 18, 10.2% from 18 to 24, 27.3% from 25 to 44, 22.1% from 45 to 64, and 16.3% who were 65 years of age or older. The median age was 37 years. For every 100 females, there were 90.0 males. For every 100 females age 18 and over, there were 86.4 males.

The median income for a household in the city was $31,033, and the median income for a family was $38,246. Males had a median income of $30,619 versus $21,765 for females. The per capita income (the average income a person in the city is earning.)
was $16,401. About 12.7% of families and 16.1% of the population were below the poverty line, including 20.1% of those under age 18 and 14.2% of those age 65 or over.

History
The area in which Lewisburg and Marshall County is located was long occupied by various cultures of indigenous peoples. Historic Native Americans were here when French, Spanish and English explorers entered the area. Revolutionary War veterans were given land grants in this area by the State of North Carolina for services rendered during the war followed in the 1780s. North Carolina still claimed this territory under its colonial charter, but later gave up that claim and Tennessee became an independent state.

Marshall County, named in honor of the young nation's first Supreme Court Chief Justice and noted American jurist, John Marshall, was established by an act of the Tennessee General Assembly in 1836. The act which created the county specified that the county seat be named Lewisburg to commemorate the deeds of frontier explorer Meriweather Lewis. He had been leader of the Lewis and Clark Expedition to explore the Louisiana Territory soon after its purchase. Lewisburg was incorporated in 1837, on a site of  donated for civic purpose.

There was white violence against freedmen during and after Reconstruction, extending into the early 20th century. Some lynchings of African Americans took place at the Marshall County Courthouse in Lewisburg during the period of highest violence around the turn of the 20th century. Two unidentified black men were lynched without trial in Lewisburg on August 5, 1903. Another account said that John Milligan (Millikin) and John L. Hunter had been killed in Needmore by a mob that week. They are likely the same men.

Until 1925, Lewisburg served the area principally as a trading and shipping center for its livestock and farm produce. As the county seat, it was a center of the justice system and active as a retail center for the area farmers.

The world headquarters of the Tennessee Walking Horse Breeders' and Exhibitors' Association has been based in Lewisburg since 1939. The Tennessee Walking Horse, a gaited breed, is considered to have been developed in Middle Tennessee, and the area is still a center of breeding and exhibitions for this horse.

Marshall County is significant partly because of three men who have served as Governor of Tennessee were living here when they were elected to office: Henry Horton, Jim Nance McCord, and Buford Ellington.

Today, Lewisburg/Marshall County is the home of several nationally known industries. Due to restructuring and movement of industry offshore, it has suffered thousands of job losses in recent years, but it maintains a viable work force.

Education
It is served by Marshall County Schools, including Marshall County High School.

Notable people
 Buford Ellington, politician living here; served as governor of the state.
 Marcus Haislip, Marcus Deshon Haislip (born December 22, 1980) is an American professional basketball player who last played for Gaziantep Basketbol of the Turkish Basketball Super League (BSL)
 Dont'a Hightower, born and raised here; professional football player for the New England Patriots
 Henry Horton, lived here; farmer and politician who served as governor of the state
 Jason Maxwell, born and raised here; is a former professional baseball player. Primarily an infielder, Maxwell first played in 1998 for the Chicago Cubs.
 Jim Nance McCord, mayor of Lewisburg (1916-1942; publisher of local newspaper; served as governor of Tennessee from 1945-1949)
 Grady Martin, rockabilly and country session musician
X Blake Freeman X - YouTuber, Internet personality, television actor, model, former rapper, singer/songwriter  
● Qualin Dont'a Hightower - (born March 12, 1990) is an American football linebacker who is a free agent. He played college football at Alabama, receiving consensus All-American honors and winning two BCS National Championships. Hightower was selected in the first round of the 2012 NFL Draft by the Patriots, where he was named to two Pro Bowls and won three Super Bowl titles.

Media

Radio stations
 WJJM 94.3 FM

References

External links

 Lewisburg Local City Guide
 Marshall County Chamber of Commerce
 Goats, Music and More Festival
 TN Farm Products

Cities in Tennessee
Cities in Marshall County, Tennessee
County seats in Tennessee
Superfund sites in Tennessee